General elections were held in India in 1996 to elect the members of the 11th Lok Sabha.The election produced a hung parliament with no single party having a clear majority. Bharatiya Janata Party, the largest party, formed a short-lived government under the premiership of Atal Bihari Vajpayee. United Front secured majority support resulting in H. D. Deve Gowda of Janata Dal succeeding Vajpayee and being the 11th Prime Minister of India, before eventually being replaced by I. K. Gujral, another United Front leader. Despite that, the country returned to the polls in 1998.
Congress wins ten seats, BJP wins sixteen.

Party-wise results summary

Results- Constituency wise

References

Indian general elections in Gujarat
Gujarat
1990s in Gujarat